Georges Demoulin (11 March 1919 – 27 July 1994) was a Belgian entomologist.
He specialised in the Ephemeroptera.

His life 
A short necrology has been published by Jacques Rigout.

He was born at Amay, He is attracted by the forms and the colors of insects, he abandons his studies of pharmacy to be engaged at the age of 28 as naturalist trainee to the Royal museum of natural History of Belgium.

After a stay of one year in Africa in the National park of Garamba, he returns to the museum where he is in charge of the collections of insects with aquatic habits.

Works 
His publications are numerous, among these we can note:
 1952. Contribution à l'étude des Ephoronidae Euthyplociinae, 1952, Bulletin de l'Institut royal des Sciences naturelles de Belgique, 28 (45), pp. 1–22
 1966. Contribution à l'étude des Ephéméroptères du Surinam, 1952, Bulletin de l'Institut royal des Sciences naturelles de Belgique, 42 (37), pp. 1–22
 1970. Ephemeroptera des faunes éthiopiennes et malgache, South African Animal Life, 14, pp. 24–170
 1975. Remarques sur la nervation alaire des Oligoneuridae (Ephemeroptera), Bulletin de l'Institut royal des Sciences naturelles de Belgique, 51, pp. 1–4

Entomological terms named after him
 Demoulinia Gilles, 1990
 Abacetus demoulini Straeno, 1963
 Adenophlebiodes demoulini Kimmis, 1960
 Afrocurydemus demoulini Selman, 1972
 Brachinus demoulini Basilewsky, 1962
 Caenis demoulini van Bruggen, 1954
 Corindia demoulini Grichanov, 2000
 Dryops demoulini Delève, 1963
 Glossidion demoulini Lugo-Ortiz & McCafferty, 1998
 Gomphoides demoulini St. Quentin, 1967
 Hikanopilon demoulini Matile, 1990
 Hyalophlebia demoulini Kimmins, 1960
 Jana demoulini Berger, 1980
 Leiodytes demoulini Guignot, 1955
 Limnichus demoulini Delève, 1980
 Melanophthalma demoulini Dajoz, 1970
 Odontolabis gazella demoulini Maes, 1981
 Pachnoda demoulini Rigout, 1978
 Thraulus demoulini Peters & Tsyu, 1973
 Triaenodes demoulini Jacquemart, 1967

References

1919 births
1994 deaths
French lepidopterists
20th-century Belgian zoologists
People from Amay